The Henry adsorption constant is the constant appearing in the linear adsorption isotherm, which formally resembles Henry's law; therefore, it is also called Henry's adsorption isotherm. It is named after British chemist William Henry. This is the simplest adsorption isotherm in that the amount of the surface adsorbate is represented to be proportional to the partial pressure of the adsorptive gas:

where:
 X - surface coverage,
 P - partial pressure,
 KH - Henry's adsorption constant.

For solutions, concentrations, or activities, are used instead of the partial pressures.

The linear isotherm can be used to describe the initial part of many practical isotherms. It is typically taken as valid for low surface coverages, and the adsorption energy being independent of the coverage (lack of inhomogeneities on the surface).

The Henry adsorption constant can be defined as:

where:
  is the number density at free phase,
  is the surface number density,

Application at a permeable wall 
If a solid body is modeled by a constant field and the structure of the field is such that it has a penetrable core, then

Introducing "the surface of zero adsorption"

where

and

we get

Taking into account that for Henry absorption constant we have

where   is the number density inside the solid, we arrive at the parametric dependence

where

Application at a static membrane 
If a static membrane is modeled by a constant field and the structure of the field is such that it has a penetrable core and vanishes when , then

We see that in this case the  sign and value depend on the potential  and temperature only.

Application at an impermeable wall

If a solid body is modeled by a constant hard-core field, then

or

where

Here

For the hard solid potential

where  is the position of the potential discontinuity. So, in this case

Choice of the dividing surface 

The choice of the dividing surface, strictly speaking, is arbitrary, however, it is very desirable to take into account the type of external potential . Otherwise, these expressions are at odds with the generally accepted concepts and common sense.

First,  must lie close to the transition layer (i.e., the region where the number density varies), otherwise it would mean the attribution of the bulk properties of one of the phase to the surface.

Second. (In some cases, choosing , where  is particle radius, excluding the "dead" volume.)

In the case of pronounced adsorption it is advisable to choose  close to the right border of the transition region.

Conversely, if  (fluid on the left), it is advisable to choose  lying on the left side of the transition layer.

Thus, except in the case of static membrane, we can always avoid the "negative adsorption" for one-component systems.

See also 
 Freundlich equation
 Langmuir adsorption model
 Brunauer–Emmett–Teller (BET) theory

References 

Physical chemistry
Statistical mechanics